is a former Korean province, one of the administrative divisions of Korea under Japanese rule. Its capital was Kankō. The province consisted of modern-day South Hamgyong Province, North Korea.

Population 
Number of people by nationality according to the 1936 census:

 Overall population: 1,602,178 people
 Japanese: 51,052 people
 Koreans: 1,544,883 people
 Other: 6,243 people

Administrative divisions

Cities 

 Kankō (capital)
 Genzan
 Kōnan

Counties 

Kanshū
Teihei
Eikō
Kōgen
Bunsen
Anpen
Kōgen
Hokusei
Rigen
Tansen
Shinkō
Chōshin
Hōzan
Sansui
Kōzan
Keizan

See also 
Provinces of Korea
Governor-General of Chōsen
Administrative divisions of Korea

Korea under Japanese rule
Former prefectures of Japan in Korea